Avelino Asprilla Padilla (born January 1, 1981, in Panama City, Panama) is a former minor league baseball player who played for Panama in multiple international baseball events, including the 2009 World Baseball Classic.

Minor league baseball career
Asprilla played professionally in the minor leagues from 1999 to 2006 in the Pittsburgh Pirates and Philadelphia Phillies organizations. He began his professional career in 1999 for the VSL Pirates, hitting .337 with 30 stolen bases. That year, he led the league in triples, with five.

In 2000, he played for the DSL Pirates, hitting .336 with 37 stolen bases. With the Williamsport Crosscutters in 2001, Asprilla's average dropped to .257, and he stole only nine bases in 56 games. He split the 2002 season between three teams - the Crosscutters, the Hickory Crawdads and the Lynchburg Hillcats - hitting a combined .238 with six home runs and seven stolen bases in 85 games.

Asprilla split the 2001 season between three teams as well - the Crawdads, the Hillcats and the GCL Pirates - hitting .277 with four stolen bases in 52 games, combined. He spent 2004 and 2005 with Lynchburg, hitting .283 with six stolen bases in 121 games in 2004 and .269 with four stolen bases and 12 home runs in 112 games in 2005.

He signed with the Phillies following the 2005 season, and he spent 2006 with two of their farm teams - the Lakewood BlueClaws and the Clearwater Threshers. That season, he hit a combined .247 with 12 stolen bases (his highest total since 2000) in 113 games. 2006 was his final season in minor league baseball.

International competition

Asprilla played in the 2003 Baseball World Cup, hitting .268 with nine runs in ten games played. In the 2007 Pan American Games, Asprilla went four for 11 with two RBI, and in the 2007 Baseball World Cup he went two for 13. In the 2008 Americas Baseball Cup, Asprilla hit .235. He appeared in two games in the 2009 World Baseball Classic, although he did not get any at-bats.

References

1981 births
Living people
2009 World Baseball Classic players
Panamanian expatriate baseball players in the United States
Baseball players at the 2007 Pan American Games
Pan American Games competitors for Panama
Sportspeople from Panama City
Clearwater Threshers players
Gulf Coast Pirates players
Hickory Crawdads players
Lakewood BlueClaws players
Lynchburg Hillcats players
Williamsport Crosscutters players